Lautertal is a municipality in the district of Coburg in Bavaria in Germany. Near Lautertal, there was between 1952 and 1992 a DECCA-transmitter.

Geography
Lautertal is in the north of the district of Coburg between the state of Thuringia and Coburg. The municipality consists of the six villages Unterlauter, Oberlauter, Tiefenlauter, Neukirchen, Tremersdorf and Rottenbach. The Buchberg (close to Rottenbach) is the highest elevation in the district.

Infrastructure

Car
Lautertal has two junctions to Bundesautobahn 73 motorway in the north and south. The former route of the Bundesstraße 4 is the longest main road of the village.

Rail Transport
The Eisenach-Lichtenfels railway line, also known as the Werra Valley Railway, ran through Lautertal until the 1970s. There was a train station in Tiefenlauter. Due to the fact that Thuringia belonged to the GDR, the train traffic was separated, later the route had to be abandoned. A reactivation is demanded by many, however the municipality is against it.

Public Transport
Oberlauter and Unterlauter are connected to Coburg by city bus line 2. The additional line 8318 connects all the other villages with Coburg.

References

Coburg (district)